Topolka is a village in Krumovgrad Municipality, Kardzhali Province, southern Bulgaria.

References

Villages in Kardzhali Province